is the highest mountain in the Arrochar Alps of Argyll, in the Southern Highlands of Scotland. It reaches , making it a Munro.

There are three usual routes of ascent. From Succoth, one may follow the same path that is used to reach The Cobbler before taking the right fork near the base of the Cobbler's main crags and continuing up the glen, across the bealach and up Ben Ìme's eastern ridge. Alternatively, the summit can be reached from the pass of Rest and be Thankful and from the Loch Lomond side, using the private road that leads to Loch Sloy.

References

External links
Computer generated summit panorama Beinn Ime Index

Mountains and hills of the Southern Highlands
Marilyns of Scotland
Mountains and hills of Argyll and Bute
Munros
One-thousanders of Scotland